Gladstone is a city in Delta County in the Upper Peninsula of the U.S. state of Michigan.  First settled in 1877, Gladstone's original name was Minnewasca. The population was 4,973 according to the 2010 census.

U.S. Highways 2 and 41 run concurrently through the city, connecting with Escanaba, nine miles (14 km) to the south. US 41 runs north to Marquette and US 2 runs east to Manistique and St. Ignace. M-35 runs northwest  to Gwinn and merges with US 2/US 41 south to Escanaba.

History

First inhabitants
The first people to occupy the Upper Peninsula of Michigan were Algonquin speaking peoples. 

Gladstone was first settled by European descendants in 1859 when the Hamilton Corporation of Fayette began using it as a shipping point for selling and transporting their iron ore.

The town was originally named Minnewasca by the Soo Line Railroad, the Ojibwa name meaning "white water." When the name was filed with the county and Secretary of State in Lansing, Senator W. D. Washburn, who had an interest in building the railroad, persuaded officials to change the name to Gladstone in honor of British premier, William Ewart Gladstone.

The earliest development was on Saunder's Point, named for Capt. Nate Saunders who headquartered there when fishing at various points along the bay. It was the location for the initial build-up of Gladstone. Today, Saunder's Point still exists as a small peninsula east of Gladstone's city park system, located in Little Bay De Noc.

Expanding beyond its iron ore roots into a shipping point for lumber, coal, and copper during the American civil war, throughout the 1860s and 1870s, Gladstone grew into a busy port.

Change of name
In 1876, the Hamilton Corporation had to move its operations when their mine dried up. The new mine location, further south, meant shipping their ore through the Escanaba port. Arthur Delano, the president of Soo Line Railroad, had commissioned a train depot built in Saunder's Point during the previous winter to start land shipping for the Hamilton Corporation. However, since this was no longer possible, Delano began commissioning local industries.

Gladstone was incorporated as a village in 1887 and as a city in 1889. Gladstone is named after the English statesman William Ewart Gladstone.

Geography

The city is located on a small projection into the Little Bay de Noc, which opens onto Green Bay on Lake Michigan.

Neighborhoods

Although Gladstone is a relatively small city, it has several distinct sections: Downtown (which hosts most of the local businesses), The Buckeye (located on the western side of the city, bordering the Brampton, MI township), and the Bluff (which hosts most of the new residential expansion, as well as Gladstone High School). Gladstone High School sports teams are referred to as the Braves, which along with the Escanaba Eskymos give Delta County two schools bearing indigenous symbols although Eskimo is spelled Eskymo to reflect the nickname “Esky”.

Climate
Due to the city's proximity to Lake Michigan, Gladstone consistently has high humidity and experiences four distinct seasons. Summers are warm and humid, with average high temperatures in the mid 80s and average lows in the mid 60s. Winters are cold, snowy and windy with temperatures often below freezing. Spring and fall are mild with low humidity. According to the National Weather Service, Gladstone's record low comes in at -60 on January 7, 1896 . To this day, this storm is referred to by Gladstone residents as "les morte a doigts," since so many of the city's residents lost fingers due to frostbite. On July 19, 1992, Gladstone experienced a rare tornado which caused moderate damage throughout the city.

Culture

Tourism and parks
Gladstone is often referred to as "The Year Round Playground" because of its myriad parks and activities. Gladstone's main park is Van Cleve, which hosts a playground (Kid's Kingdom), a skateboarding park, baseball field, basketball court, fitness trail, a white sand beach with a water slide, boardwalk, as well as a harbor with boat ramps and a fish cleaning station.

Gladstone also offers The Gladstone Golf Course which winds through the Upper Peninsula Forest, crossing water on 6 of 18 holes.

Another Gladstone attraction is the Gladstone Sports Park, which hosts several baseball fields, skiing and snowboarding runs and a tubing facility. The Park itself is often rented out for other activities, including wedding receptions, and high school graduation parties.

Gladstone also hosts the Days River Trails, which are hiked and biked in the spring, summer, and fall. In the winter, these trails are used primarily for cross-country skiing.

Gladstone had much more tourism in the 1950s.  The decline started when the state built I-75 from St. Ignace to Sault Ste. Marie, Michigan routing the "Around the Lake" tourism directly to the border crossing to Sault Ste. Marie, Ontario. The second blow that Gladstone is beginning to recover from was building a 4-lane expressway which bypasses downtown Gladstone, thus causing limited access from one end of Gladstone to the other.

These two acts committed Gladstone to bedroom community status for the future. All shopping and many jobs are in Escanaba.

However, the white sandy beaches, clear warm water and walleyes are still there and the many crafty tourists that return every year. The rest of the Upper Peninsula and Wisconsin shorelines are exposed with cold lake water. Only in Gladstone's Little Bay de Noc do these conditions hold true.
(Sources: The highway features are still there.)

Economy

Local businesses include Marble Arms, Besse Forest Products, Canadian National Railway, Happy Rock Boutique, VanAire Inc, Independent Machine Co., Pardon Inc., Bramco Containers, Hoegh Pet Caskets, Brampton Bike and Ski, Bay de Noc Lure Company (makers of the "Swedish Pimple" and "Do-Jigger"), Main Street Pizza, D&M Subs, The Dairy Flo, Gladstone Square Pharmacy, and The Saloon. Many of Gladstone's residents also find work in Escanaba, particularly with one of the New Page Corporation's mills, which is the area's largest employer.

Media
Gladstone was featured in the 2010 documentary film Catfish.

Transportation

  exists in two discontinuous segments, with the western portion running from Everett, Washington and through Gladstone before ending at Interstate 75 in St. Ignace, Michigan. The eastern portion runs from Rouses Point, New York to Houlton, Maine, with a total of 2,571 miles between the two segments.
  runs 2,000 miles from east of Copper Harbor, Michigan, at a modest cul-de-sac near Fort Wilkins Historic State Park at the tip of the Keweenaw Peninsula in Michigan's Upper Peninsula, through Gladstone, and on to the Brickell neighborhood of Downtown Miami. 
  
Indian Trails provides daily intercity bus service between St. Ignace and Ironwood, Michigan and between Hancock and Milwaukee with a stop in Gladstone.

Notable people
 Terry Ahola, professional ski racer, member of US Ski Team
 Robert John Cornell, former member of the United States House of Representatives from Wisconsin, and a Roman Catholic priest
 Becky Iverson, professional golfer
 Frank Smith, cartoon animator and film director
 Bart Stupak, former member of the United States House of Representatives, Upper Peninsula of Michigan
 Kevin Tapani, professional baseball pitcher
 David LeGault, essayist

Demographics

2010 census
As of the census of 2010, there were 4,973 people, 2,182 households, and 1,374 families residing in the city. The racial makeup of the city was 95.4% White, 0.2% African American, 1.9% Native American, 0.3% Asian, 0.3% from other races, and 1.8% from two or more races. Hispanic or Latino of any race were 1.0% of the population.

There were 2,182 households, of which 27.9% had children under the age of 18 living with them, 49.5% were married couples living together, 9.3% had a female householder with no husband present, 4.1% had a male householder with no wife present, and 37.0% were non-families. 32.4% of all households were made up of individuals, and 17.4% had someone living alone who was 65 years of age or older. The average household size was 2.27 and the average family size was 2.84.

The median age in the city was 43.6 years. 22.7% of residents were under the age of 18; 6.5% were between the ages of 18 and 24; 22.3% were from 25 to 44; 27.5% were from 45 to 64; and 21.1% were 65 years of age or older. The gender makeup of the city was 47.7% male and 52.3% female.

2000 census
As of the census of 2000, there were 5,032 people, 2,126 households, and 1,392 families residing in the city. The racial makeup of the city was 96.76% White, 0.14% African American, 1.47% Native American, 0.22% Asian, 0.08% Pacific Islander, 0.04% from other races, and 1.29% from two or more races. Hispanic or Latino of any race were 0.42% of the population. 14.3% were of French, 14.0% German, 12.2% Swedish, 10.3% French Canadian, 6.1% English, 5.2% Irish and 5.0% Belgian ancestry according to Census 2000. 99.5% spoke English as their first language.

There were 2,126 households, out of which 29.7% had children under the age of 18 living with them, 52.6% were married couples living together, 9.9% had a female householder with no husband present, and 34.5% were non-families. 30.8% of all households were made up of individuals, and 16.1% had someone living alone who was 65 years of age or older.  The average household size was 2.36 and the average family size was 2.94.

In the city, the population was spread out, with 24.9% under the age of 18, 7.3% from 18 to 24, 25.7% from 25 to 44, 23.1% from 45 to 64, and 19.0% who were 65 years of age or older.  The median age was 40 years. For every 100 females, there were 90.6 males.  For every 100 females aged 18 and over, there were 87.6 males.

The median income for a household in the city was $34,328, and the median income for a family was $47,899. Males had a median income of $43,400 versus $25,662 for females. The per capita income for the city was $17,973.  About 7.8% of families and 10.2% of the population were below the poverty line, including 13.9% of those under age 18 and 9.5% of those age 65 or over.

References

External links
 Gladstone, Michigan website

Cities in Delta County, Michigan
Michigan populated places on Lake Michigan
1887 establishments in Michigan